5-Methyl-3,4-methylenedioxyamphetamine (5-Methyl-MDA) is an entactogen and psychedelic designer drug of the amphetamine class. It is a ring-methylated homologue of MDA and a structural isomer of MDMA.

Effects and research

Drug discrimination studies showed that 5-methyl-MDA substitutes for MDA, MMAI, and LSD, but not amphetamine, suggesting that it produces a mix of entactogen and hallucinogenic effects without any stimulant effects.

5-Methyl-MDA acts as a selective serotonin releasing agent (SSRA) with IC50 values of 107nM, 11,600nM, and 1,494nM for serotonin, dopamine, and norepinephrine efflux. It is over 5 times more potent than MDA in vitro assays, with a suitable active dose possibly in vivo being around 15–25 mg. Subsequent testing in vivo, however, has found that it is not as potent as once thought and is active at at least 100 mg. 2-Methyl-MDA is also much more potent than MDA, but is not quite as potent as 5-methyl-MDA. 6-methyl-MDMA (also known as Madam-6) is mostly inactive, likely due to steric hindrance.

Recent research has used data on 2-methyl-MDA and 5-methyl-MDA to help guide computer modeling of the serotonin transporter complex.

Legal status
5-Methyl-MDA is not scheduled by the United Nations' Convention on Psychotropic Substances.

United States
5-Methyl-MDA is not scheduled at the federal level in the United States, but it is possible that 5-Methyl-MDA could legally be considered an analog of MDA, in which case, sales or possession could potentially be prosecuted under the Federal Analogue Act.

References 

Entactogens and empathogens
Substituted amphetamines
Benzodioxoles
Designer drugs
Serotonin releasing agents